Smith Mountain is the name of over thirty summits in the United States, including:
Smith Mountain, a range in northern Pittsylvania County, Virginia, from which Smith Mountain Lake gets its name.
Smith Mountain (Taconic Mountains), a peak in western Massachusetts.
Smith Mountain (Death Valley), a peak in Death Valley National Park in California.